() or MaxValu is a Japanese retail store chain. Until 2000 it was named Yaohan, but changed its name after its bankruptcy and takeover by the ÆON Group.

MaxValu in other countries

Thailand
In 2008, the owners ÆON Group rebranded all JUSCO stores in Thailand to Maxvalu Tokai. In 2012, Maxvalu Tokai in Thailand had a total of 68 stores. Maxvalu Tokai in Thailand has two formats and brands of supermarket:

 MaxValu Supermarket is a full-scale format of supermarket, around 1,000-3,000 square meters.
 MaxValu Tanjai is a mini-scale format of supermarket, around 300-800 square meters.

Malaysia
In Malaysia, all MaxValu stores are known as Pasar Raya MaxValu (MaxValu Supermarket in Malay). They take up a smaller format and branded as convenience stores, being significantly smaller than the usual JUSCO outlets in Malaysia. They are open for business 10:00 to 23:00 daily.

China
Maxvalu has presence in Happy Valley, Zhujiang New Town, Tianhe, Guangzhou.

External links
Maxvalu Tokai (in Japanese)

Retail companies established in 1962
Supermarkets of Japan
Companies based in Shizuoka Prefecture
Aeon Group
Companies listed on the Tokyo Stock Exchange